Rosemund J. Handler is a South African writer. Her novel Tsamma Season (2009) was shortlisted for the 2010 Commonwealth Writers' Prize.

Born in Johannesburg, Handler lives in Cape Town. She has written novels, short stories and poetry. She has also written for newspapers including the Daily Maverick, and the Mail & Guardian.

Works
 Madlands. Johannesburg: Penguin Books, 2006.
 Katy's Kid. Johannesburg: Penguin Books, 2007.
 Tsamma Season. Johannesburg: Penguin Books, 2009.
 Us and Them. Johannesburg: Penguin, 2012.
 (with Jana van Niekerk and Natalie Railoun) For the Duration: poems. Braamfontein: Botsotso, 2015.

References

External links
 Rosemund Handler on Novel-writing

Year of birth missing (living people)
Living people
South African novelists
South African short story writers
South African poets
South African women writers
People from Johannesburg